Hasharabad (also Romanized as Ḩasharābād and Ḩasherābād) is a village in Deh Bakri Rural District, in the Central District of Bam County, Kerman Province, Iran. At the 2006 census, its population was 32, in 5 families.

References 

Populated places in Bam County